Malone is a town in Jackson County, Florida, United States.  The population was 2,088 at the 2010 census.

Geography

Florida State Road 2 runs through the center of town as 8th Avenue, leading east  to the Georgia border at the Chattahoochee River, and west  to Campbellton. State Road 71 passes through Malone as 10th Street, crossing State Road 2 in the center of town. SR 71 leads north  to the Alabama border and south  to Marianna, the Jackson County seat.

Demographics

2020 census
Note: the US Census treats Hispanic/Latino as an ethnic category. This table excludes Latinos from the racial categories and assigns them to a separate category. Hispanics/Latinos can be of any race. 

As of the 2020 United States census, there were 1,959 people, 272 households, and 160 families residing in the town.

2000 census
As of the census of 2000, there were 2,009 people, 311 households, and 199 families residing in the town. The racial makeup of the town was 50.77% White, 43.50% African American, 0.85% Native American, 0.10% Asian, 1.64% from other races, and 3.14% from two or more races. Hispanic or Latino of any race were 7.13% of the population.

There were 311 households, out of which 28.0% had children under the age of 18 living with them, 42.8% were married couples living together, 19.0% had a female householder with no husband present, and 36.0% were non-families. 34.4% of all households were made up of individuals, and 20.3% had someone living alone who was 65 years of age or older. The average household size was 2.32 and the average family size was 3.01.

In the town, the population was spread out, with 9.2% under the age of 18, 9.0% from 18 to 24, 49.6% from 25 to 44, 25.5% from 45 to 64, and 6.7% who were 65 years of age or older. The median age was 37 years. For every 100 females, there were 401.8 males. For every 100 females age 18 and over, there were 482.1 males.
(The reason for the extraordinarily high ratio of males to females is due to the presence of an all-male state prison within the city limits.)

The median income for a household in the town was $28,611, and the median income for a family was $38,281. Males had a median income of $31,979 versus $19,345 for females. The per capita income for the town was $5,701. About 7.9% of families and 10.8% of the population were below the poverty line, including 12.3% of those under age 18 and 17.5% of those age 65 or over.

Education

Malone School houses grades K–12 with approximately 600 students. Malone School earned a "A" on the last FCAT scores.

Malone High School boys basketball program has won 14 state championships. The girls basketball program has won 1 state championship.

Points of interest 

 LORAN-C transmitter Malone

Notable people

 Frank Smith, baseball player who was a resident of Malone at the time of his death

References

Towns in Jackson County, Florida
Towns in Florida